Římov refers to the following places in the Czech Republic:

 Římov (České Budějovice District)
 Římov (Třebíč District)